Enrique is the Spanish variant of the given name Heinrich of Germanic origin.

Equivalents in other languages are Henry (English), Enric (Catalan), Enrico (Italian), Henrik (Swedish, Danish, and Norwegian), Heinrich (German), Hendrik, Henk (Dutch), Henri (French), and Henrique (Portuguese). Common nicknames of Enrique are Kiki, Kiko, Kike, Rick, Ricky, and Quique.

Enrique is also a surname. A variant surname is Enriquez (son of Enrique).

Notable people with the name include:

Given name
 Enrique of Malacca (fl. 1511–1521), Malay slave who may have been the first person to travel around the world
 Enrique Aguirre (born 1979), Argentine athlete
 Enrique Álvarez Félix (1934–1996), Mexican actor
 Enrique Bolaños (1928–2021), President of Nicaragua from 2002 to 2007
 Enrique Bunbury (born 1967), Spanish singer and band member of Heroes Del Silencio
 Enrique Campos (born 1961), Venezuelan road bicycle racer
 Enrique Castillo (born 1949), American actor
 Enrique Escalante (born 1984), Puerto Rican volleyball player
 Enrique de la Fuente (born 1975), Spanish volleyball player
 Enrique Gil (born 1992), Filipino actor, dancer, and commercial model
 Enrique Granados (1867–1916), Spanish pianist and classical composer
 Enrique Hermitte (1871–1955), Argentine geologist
 Enrique Iglesias (born 1975), Spanish singer, songwriter, record producer, philanthropist and actor
 Enrique V. Iglesias (born 1930), Uruguayan-Spanish economist
 Enrique Ika (c. 1859–after 1900), Rapa Nui leader
 Enrique Lores (born 1964/65), Spanish business executive, CEO of HP Inc
 Enrique Fernando Ortiz Moruno (born 1977), Spanish football player
 Enrique Maciel, Argentine composer and musician
 Enrique "Ricky" Martin (born 1971), Puerto Rican singer, songwriter, actor, author, record producer, and humanitarian
 Enrique Martín (disambiguation), several people
 Enrique López Pérez (born 1991), Spanish tennis player
 Enrique Peña Nieto (born 1966), 57th President of Mexico
 Enrique Jardiel Poncela (1901–1952), Spanish playwright
 Enrique van Rysselberghe Herrera (born 1976), Chilean politician
 Enrique Sabari (born 1965), Cuban weightlifter
 Enrique Santamarina (1870–1937), Argentine politician
 Enrique Fuentes Quintana (1924–2007), Spanish politician and economist
 Enrique González (disambiguation), several people
 Quique Sánchez Flores (born 1965), Spanish football coach
 Enrique Murciano (born 1973), Cuban-American actor (Without A Trace)
 Jorge Enrique Adoum (1926–2009), Ecuadorian writer
 Enrique Vera Ibáñez (born 1954), Mexican/Swedish race walker
 Enrique Vicente Hernández (born 1945), Spanish football player
 Enrique Hernández (baseball) (born 1991), Puerto Rican baseball player
 Enrique Zóbel de Ayala (1877–1943), Spanish Filipino businessman
 Enrique Zobel (1927–2004), Filipino businessman and polo player
 Enriquillo (fl. 16th cen.), Taino resistance leader also known as Enrique

Surname 

 Carlos Enrique (born 1963), Argentine footballer
 Fernando Enrique (canoeist) (born 1998), Cuban sprint canoeist
 Fernando Enrique (footballer) (born 1985), Argentine midfielder
 Héctor Enrique (born 1962), Argentine footballer
 José Enrique (footballer) (born 1986), Spanish footballer
 Klaus Enrique (born 1975), Mexican-German sculptor and photographer
 Marcos Enrique (born 1999), Argentine footballer
 Ramiro Enrique (born 2001), Argentine footballer
 Roberto Enrique, American actor and singer-songwriter
 Sergi Enrique (born 1987), Spanish field hockey player

See also
 List of storms named Enrique
 José Enrique, a given name
 Luis Enrique (disambiguation)
 Henry (disambiguation)

References

Spanish masculine given names